Ambehta Shekhan is a village in Saharanpur district in the Indian state of Uttar Pradesh.

Geography

References

Villages in Saharanpur district